The 1905 College Football All-America team is composed of college football players who were selected as All-Americans by various organizations and writers that chose College Football All-America Teams for the 1905 college football season. The organizations that chose the teams included Walter Camp for Collier's Weekly and Caspar Whitney for Outing Magazine.

All-American selections for 1905

Ends

 Mark Catlin Sr., Chicago (WC-2; CW-1)
 Ralph Glaze, Dartmouth (WC-1; NYEP; NYT; NYW)
 Thomas Shevlin, Yale (College Football Hall of Fame) (WC-1; CW-1; NYEP; NYT; NYG)
 Izzy Levene, Penn (WC-3; NYW; NYG)
 Bobby Marshall, Minnesota (WC-2)
 Norman Tooker, Princeton (WC-3)

Tackles

 Karl Brill, Harvard (CW-1; NYW)
 Otis Lamson, Penn (WC-1; CW-1; NYEP; NYW; NYG; NYEP; NYT; NYG)
 Beaton Squires, Harvard (WC-1)
 James Cooney, Princeton (NYT)
 Robert Forbes, Yale (WC-2)
 Joe Curtis, Michigan (WC-2)
 Wilson Bertke, Wisconsin (WC-3)
 Lucius Horatio Biglow, Yale (WC-3)

Guards
 Francis Burr, Harvard (WC-1; CW-1; NYW)
 Roswell Tripp, Yale (WC-1; CW-1; NYEP; NYT; NYW)
 F. Hobson, Penn (NYEP; NYG)
 Harry Von Kersberg, Harvard (NYG)
 Elmer Thompson, Cornell (WC-2)
 Henry Schulte, Michigan (WC-2)
 Albert M. Fletcher, Brown (WC-3)
 Tiny Maxwell, Swarthmore (College Football Hall of Fame) (WC-3; NYT)

Centers
 Robert Torrey, Penn (WC-1; CW-1; NYEP; NYT; NYW; NYG)
 Carl S. Flanders, Yale (WC-2)
 Burton Pike Gale, Chicago (WC-3)

Quarterbacks

 Walter Eckersall, Chicago (WC-1; CW-1 [fb]; NYEP)
 Guy Hutchinson, Yale (WC-2; CW-1; NYT; NYG)
 Vince Stevenson, Penn (College Football Hall of Fame) (NYW)
 Wilmer G. Crowell, Swarthmore (WC-3)

Halfbacks
 Jack Hubbard, Amherst (WC-1)
 Daniel Hurley, Harvard (CW-1)
 Howard Roome, Yale (WC-1; NYT; NYW; NYG)
 Henry Torney, Army (CW-1; NYT [fb]; NYW [fb]; NYG [fb])
 Thomas Hammond, Michigan (WC-3; NYEP)
 Main, Dartmouth (NYEP)
 George Walder, Cornell (NYG)
 Samuel Finley Brown Morse, Yale (WC-2; NYT; NYW)
 H. W. Sheble, Penn (WC-2)
 A. H. Douglas, Navy (CW-2)
 Albion Findlay, Wisconsin (WC-3)

Fullbacks
James B. McCormick, Princeton (WC-1)
 A. Rex Flinn, Yale (NYEP)
 Phillip Von Saltza, Columbia (WC-2)
 Hugo Bezdek, Chicago (College Football Hall of Fame) (WC-3)

Key
NCAA recognized selectors for 1905
 WC = Collier's Weekly as selected by Walter Camp
 CW = Caspar Whitney for Outing magazine.

Other selectors
 NYEP = New York Evening Post
 NYT = New York Times
 NYW = New York World
 NYG = New York Globe

Bold = Consensus All-American
 1 – First-team selection
 2 – Second-team selection
 3 – Third-team selection

See also
 1905 All-Southern college football team
 1905 All-Western college football team

References

All-America Team
College Football All-America Teams